The 1999 CCHA Men's Ice Hockey Tournament was the 28th CCHA Men's Ice Hockey Tournament. It was played between March 12 and March 20, 1999. Opening round games were played at campus sites, while all 'final four' games were played at Joe Louis Arena in Detroit, Michigan. By winning the tournament, Michigan received the Central Collegiate Hockey Association's automatic bid to the 1999 NCAA Division I Men's Ice Hockey Tournament.

Format
The tournament featured three rounds of play. The three teams that finish below eighth place in the standings were not eligible for postseason play. In the quarterfinals, the first and eighth seeds, the second and seventh seeds, the third seed and sixth seeds and the fourth seed and fifth seeds played a best-of-three series, with the winners advancing to the semifinals. In the semifinals, the remaining highest and lowest seeds and second highest and second lowest seeds play a single-game, with the winners advancing to the finals. The tournament champion receives an automatic bid to the 1999 NCAA Men's Division I Ice Hockey Tournament.

Conference standings
Note: GP = Games played; W = Wins; L = Losses; T = Ties; PTS = Points; GF = Goals For; GA = Goals Against

Bracket

Note: * denotes overtime period(s)

Quarterfinals

(1) Michigan State vs. (8) Lake Superior State

(2) Michigan vs. (7) Bowling Green

(3) Ohio State vs. (6) Ferris State

(4) Notre Dame vs. (5) Northern Michigan

Semifinals

(1) Michigan State vs. (5) Northern Michigan

(2) Michigan vs. (3) Ohio State

Championship

(2) Michigan vs. (5) Northern Michigan

Tournament awards

All-Tournament Team
F Mark Kosick* (Michigan)
F Sean Ritchlin (Michigan)
F J.P. Vigier (Northern Michigan)
D Sean Connolly (Northern Michigan)
D Mike Van Ryn (Michigan)
G Josh Blackburn (Michigan)
* Most Valuable Player(s)

References

External links
1998-99 CCHA Season

CCHA Men's Ice Hockey Tournament
Ccha tournament